The 2001 Jeep Seattle Bowl (December) was the first edition to be named as such of the college football bowl game (previously known as the Oahu Bowl), and was to be played at Safeco Field in Seattle, Washington. The game pitted the Georgia Tech Yellow Jackets from the ACC and the Stanford Cardinal from the Pac-10. The game was the final competition of the 2001 football season for each team and resulted in a 24–14 Georgia Tech upset victory over the 11th ranked Stanford team.

The game was played at Safeco Field because Qwest Field had not yet been completed.

Coaches
Georgia Tech coach Mac McWhorter was coaching on an interim basis (his only game as head coach) after coach George O'Leary announced he was resigning to take the same position at Notre Dame. Due to a controversy surrounding O'Leary's resume, and in an odd twist of fate, McWhorter's counterpart Tyrone Willingham ended up as the new Notre Dame coach and thus this edition of the Seattle Bowl was his last game at Stanford.

See also
Seattle Bowl

References

External links
Box score and summary of game at CNNSI.com
Recap of game at CNNSI.com

Seattle Bowl
Seattle Bowl
Georgia Tech Yellow Jackets football bowl games
Stanford Cardinal football bowl games
Seattle Bowl
December 2001 sports events in the United States